French River is a community  in the Canadian province of Nova Scotia, located in  Colchester County, approximately 3 km south-west of Tatamagouche.

References
The Atlas of Canada

Communities in Colchester County
General Service Areas in Nova Scotia